Carl Nelson was a Danish Greco-Roman wrestler. He was the European welterweight champion.

References

Danish male sport wrestlers